David Halley (born 12 October 1986) is a former Wales international rugby league footballer who played as a er and  in the 2000s and 2010s. He plays as an amateur for Bradford Dudley Hill RLFC.

He played at club level for the Bradford Bulls and the Wakefield Trinity Wildcats in the Super League, and the Keighley Cougars in Championship 1. Halley won the Bradford Bulls' 2009 Player of the Year award.

Background
A product of the Bradford Academy, Halley is renowned for his tremendous pace and acceleration and was a firm favourite of the Bradford fans.

Fastest Man competition
He came third behind Darren Albert, in the Fastest Man in Rugby League competition in 2005. He was entered into the 2009 event.

First Team Début
On 15 April 2007 Halley coming off the bench made a try scoring début at Grattan Stadium against Hull Kingston Rovers. The following week Halley made his full début against Hull F.C. at the KC Stadium

2008 
Halley established himself in the first team in 2008, he scored 4 tries against Toulouse in the Bradford Bulls record 98–6 win

2009
Halley was on Loan at Wakefield Trinity Wildcats, and scored both tries in the 12–6 win over Wigan Warriors, Halley played 5 games for Wakefield Trinity Wildcats until he returned to Bradford in March 2009.
By April 2009 Halley had established himself as the first-choice full back for the Bulls and in July 2009 his form was rewarded when he signed a new two-year contract, extending his stay at Bradford until the end of 2011

On 30 June 2011 Bradford Bulls released Halley from the rest of his contract so that he could feature more regularly in first team rugby, he was quickly snapped up by neighbours Keighley Cougars.

International level
He has played for Wales at international, and made a two try début against Papua New Guinea on 28 October at the Brewery Field.

He was selected in the Wales squad to face England at the Keepmoat Stadium prior to England's departure for the 2008 Rugby League World Cup.

In 2009 he announced that he was switching his International allegiance from Wales to England in an effort to represent his native country in the 2013 Rugby League World Cup

in 2017 Dave signed on for Wibsey FC, weighing in at 16st, but was still recorded as the fastest player in the club's history; just in front of Joe Brooksbank who had had 3 knee replacements at the time.

Statistics

Club career

Representative career

References

External links
 (archived by web.archive.org) Bradford Bulls profile

1986 births
Living people
Bradford Bulls players
English people of Welsh descent
English rugby league players
Keighley Cougars players
People educated at St. Bede's Grammar School
Rugby league fullbacks
Rugby league players from Bradford
Rugby league wingers
Wakefield Trinity players
Wales national rugby league team players